The Year's Best Science Fiction: Thirty-Fifth Annual Collection is an anthology of science fiction short stories edited by Gardner Dozois, the thirty-fifth volume in an ongoing series. It was first published in hardcover, trade paperback and ebook by St. Martin's Griffin in July 2018. This is the last book in the series due to the editor's death.

Summary
The book collects 38 novellas, novelettes and short stories by various science fiction authors, with an introductory summation of the year, notes and concluding bibliography by the editor. The stories were previously published in 2017 in various science fiction and other magazines.

Contents
 THE MOON IS NOT A BATTLEFIELD, Indrapramit Das
 MY ENGLISH NAME, R.S. Benedict
 AN EVENING WITH SEVERYN GRIMES, Rich Larson
 VANGUARD 2.0, Carter Scholz
 STARLIGHT EXPRESS, Michael Swanwick
 THE MARTIAN OBELISK, Linda Nagata
 WE WHO LIVE IN THE HEART, Kelly Robson
 WINTER TIMESHARE, Ray Nayler
 DEAR SARAH, Nancy Kress
 NIGHT PASSAGE, Alastair Reynolds
 THE DRAGON THAT FLEW OUT OF THE SUN, Aliette de Bodard
 WAITING OUT THE END OF THE WORLD IN PATTY’S PLACE CAFE, Naomi Krtizer
 THE HUNGER AFTER YOU’RE FED, James S.A. Corey
 ASSASSINS, Jack Skillingstead & Burt Courtier
 THE MARTIAN JOB, Jaine Fenn
 THE ROAD TO THE SEA, Lavie Tidhar
 UNCANNY VALLEY, Greg Egan
 THE WORDLESS, Indrapramit Das
 PAN HUMANISM: HOPE AND PRAGMATICS, Jessica Barber and Sara Saab
 ZIGEUNER, Harry Turtledove
 THE PROVING GROUND, Alec Nevala-Lee
 ZEN AND THE ART OF SPACESHIP MAINTENANCE, Tobias Buckell
 THE INFLUENCE MACHINE, Sean McMullen
 CANOE, Nancy Kress
 THE HISTORY OF THE INVASION TOLD IN FIVE DOGS, Kelly Jennings
 PRIME MEREDIAN, Silvia Moreno-Garcia
 TRICERATOPS, Ian McHugh
 MINES, Eleanor Arnason
 THERE USED TO BE OLIVE TREES, Rich Larson
 WHENDING MY WAY BACK HOME, Bill Johnson
 DEATH ON MARS, Madeline Ashby
 ELEPHANT ON TABLE, Bruce Sterling
 NUMBER 39 SKINK, Suzanne Palmer
 A SERIES OF STEAKS, Vina Jie-Min Prased
 THE LAST BOAT-BUILDER IN BALLYVOLOON, Finbarr O'Reilley
 THE RESIDUE OF FIRE, Robert Reed
 SIDEWALKS, Maureen F. McHugh
 NEXUS, Michael F. Flynn

Notes

2018 anthologies
35
St. Martin's Press books
2010s science fiction works
Science fiction anthologies